No Secrets was an American girl group formed in 2000. The group consisted of five members: Angel Faith, Carly Lewis, Erin Tanner, Jessica Fried and Jade Ryusaki. The group debuted in the United States in 2001 with the single "Kids in America".

History

2000–2002: Formation, debut album and tour
No Secrets was formed by Carly's father, Adrian Gurvitz, a music producer from London. She wrote a letter to him asking to put a group together. Soon after, Jade was invited; Carly and Jade's mothers were friends. Erin, Jade's cousin, joined next. Later, the three girls found Angel in an advertisement for a singing group; she joined, bringing Jessica with her. Once the group line-up had been completed, No Secrets began recording songs for their debut album. The girls worked with a variety of producers and songwriters, including Adrian Gurvitz, Andy Goldmark and Riprock 'n' Alex G. The process took a number of months. They took a break from recording and album prep to go touring and promoting their group.  In July 2001, No Secrets joined Aaron Carter in Toronto for the shooting of his video "Oh Aaron" and provided backing vocals for the song. They were also featured in another track of off his album, "Stride (Jump on the Fizzy)." In 2002, after touring with Carter for four months, they filmed their first video, the home VHS and DVD release No Secrets - Get to Know Us, and resumed work on their album.

Later that year, the group released their self-titled debut album, with singles "That's What Girls Do" and "Kids in America." The latter was featured in the soundtrack for 2001 film Jimmy Neutron: Boy Genius, and its music video was included as a bonus for the film's VHS release. "That's What Girls Do" played in the end credits of The Powerpuff Girls Movie, and its music video was a bonus feature on the DVD. The song would later be used in The Hot Chick. They also recorded "Little Angel of Mine" for the soundtrack of Stuart Little 2.

2003–2004: Faith's departure and Friends Forever
In early 2003, No Secrets was featured on DisneyMania singing a cover of "Kiss the Girl" from The Little Mermaid.

Soon after singing the majority of leads in the band, Angel left the group to pursue a solo career, releasing the album Believe in Angels... Believe in Me in 2004, just as the finishing touches were being put on No Secrets' second album, Friends Forever. The album was released with Angel featured in the artwork because it was too close to the release date and too far in production to make any changes. The four remaining members recorded and shot a video for the song "Once Upon (Another) Dream" for Disney's 2003 re-release of Sleeping Beauty. At one point, many rumors floated about a new member joining the girl group, but no official statements were ever made. Until blog posts and other articles were created a few years later stating, Lady Gaga was confirmed to promptly replace Angel in late 2003 but after her manager backed out of the project too early, Gaga (then known as Stefani) didn't make it into the group.

2005: Break-up
Disagreements between the remaining four members of the group led to the eventual break-up of No Secrets in March 2005.

Jessica Fried took on a solo career, signing with Reprise Records under the name Jessi Malay. Erin Tanner adopted the stage name Nicki Foxx and began working on solo material.

In a 2007 interview, Fried commented on the break-up, stating that the girls got along great but greedy parental actions ended up breaking the group apart.

In 2007, Angel Faith retired from the entertainment industry and began pursuing an education. In June 2009, she graduated magna cum laude from UCLA and went on to complete a doctorate degree in clinical psychology at Pepperdine University. Jade Ryusaki now resides in Hawaii as a model.

Members

Discography

Studio albums
 No Secrets (2002)
 Friends Forever (Unreleased; intended for 2004)

Singles
"Kids in America"
"That's What Girls Do"
"Kiss the Girl" (Disneymania)
"Once Upon (Another) Dream"

Video
 Get to Know Us (released in the United States VHS/DVD format on March 19, 2002)

References

External links
No Secrets at Yahoo! Music
 

American pop girl groups
Jive Records artists
Musical groups from Los Angeles
Musical groups established in 2000
Musical groups disestablished in 2005
Teen pop groups
Vocal quintets